In mathematics, a Killing tensor or Killing tensor field is a generalization of a Killing vector, for symmetric tensor fields instead of just vector fields. It is a concept in pseudo-Riemannian geometry, and is mainly used in the theory of general relativity. Killing tensors satisfy an equation similar to Killing's equation for Killing vectors. Like Killing vectors, every Killing tensor corresponds to a quantity which is conserved along geodesics. However, unlike Killing vectors, which are associated with symmetries (isometries) of a manifold, Killing tensors generally lack such a direct geometric interpretation. Killing tensors are named after Wilhelm Killing.

Definition and properties
In the following definition, parentheses around tensor indices are notation for symmetrization. For example:

Definition
A Killing tensor is a tensor field  (of some order m) on a (pseudo)-Riemannian manifold which is symmetric (that is) and satisfies:

This equation is a generalization of Killing's equation for Killing vectors:

Properties
Killing vectors are a special case of Killing tensors. Another simple example of a Killing tensor is the metric tensor itself. A linear combination of Killing tensors is a Killing tensor.

Every Killing tensor corresponds to a constant of motion on geodesics. More specifically, for every geodesic with tangent vector , the quantity  is constant along the geodesic.

Examples
The following examples focus on Killing tensors not simply obtained from Killing vectors.

FLRW metric
The Friedmann–Lemaître–Robertson–Walker metric, widely used in cosmology, has spacelike Killing vectors corresponding to its spatial symmetries. It also has a Killing tensor

where a is the scale factor,  is the t-coordinate basis vector, and the −+++ signature convention is used.

Kerr metric

The Kerr metric, describing a rotating black hole, has two independent Killing vectors. One Killing vector corresponds to the time translation symmetry of the metric, and another corresponds to the axial symmetry about the axis of rotation. In addition, as shown by Walker and Penrose (1970), there is a nontrivial Killing tensor of order 2. The constant of motion corresponding to this Killing tensor is called the Carter constant.

Killing-Yano tensor

An antisymmetric tensor of order p, is a Killing-Yano tensor :fr:Tenseur de Killing-Yano if it satisfies the equation
.
While also a generalization of the Killing vector, it differs from the usual Killing tensor in that the covariant derivative is only contracted with one tensor index.

See also
Killing form
Killing vector field
Wilhelm Killing

References

Riemannian geometry